The Bangash, Bungish or Bangakh are a tribe of Pashtuns, inhabiting their traditional homeland, historically known as Bangash district, which stretches from Kohat to Tall and Spīn Ghar in Khyber Pakhtunkhwa, Pakistan. They also live as a smaller population in Paktia, Afghanistan. The Bangash are also settled in large numbers in Uttar Pradesh, India, especially in the city of Farrukhabad, which was founded in 1714 by Nawab Muhammad Khan Bangash.

Etymology
According to a popular folk etymology, the name Bangash, Bungish or Bangakh is derived from bon-kash, which is Persian for "root drawer" or "root destroyer," implying that during battles, the Bangash would not rest until they had annihilated the enemy.

Genealogy
According to the popular narrative, the Bangash tribe descended from a man named Ismail, who is described as a governor of Multan whose 11th-generation ancestor was Khalid ibn al-Walid, the famous Arab commander of the Islamic prophet Muhammad. According to the legend, Ismail moved from Multan to settle in Gardez, Paktia, while his wife was from Farmul in Urgun, Paktika. Ismail had two sons, Gār and Sāmil, who were the progenitors of the modern Gari and Samilzai clans of the Bangash, respectively.

Modern scholars reject this account as apocryphal,

History
During the early modern period, the Bangash homeland was known as "Bangash district and was ruled by the Khan Of Hangu since 1540 which is well documented " Babur, a Timurid (and later Mughal) ruler from Fergana (in present-day Uzbekistan) who captured Kabul in 1504, described Bangash district in his Baburnama as one of the 14 tūmān of Kabul province.

Timurid raids

In 1505, after plundering Kohat for two days, Babur's Timurid army marched southwest to raid Bangash district. As they reached a valley surrounded by mountains between Kohat and Hangu, the Bangash Pashtuns occupied the hills on both sides, surrounding the army. However, the Timurids successfully pushed the Pashtuns down towards a nearby detached hill, after which the Timurids surrounded them from all sides and got hold of them. About 100 to 200 Pashtuns were taken during the attack. Babur wrote in his Baburnama: "We had been told that when Afghans [Pashtuns] are powerless to resist, they go before their foe with grass between their teeth, this being as much as to say, 'I am your cow.' Here we saw this custom; Afghans unable to make resistance, came before us with grass between their teeth. Those our men had brought in as prisoners were ordered to be beheaded and a pillar of their heads was set up in our camp."

On the next day, Babur reached Hangu, where the Bangash Pashtuns had fortified a sangar on the top of a hill. The Timurid army immediately captured it and beheaded about 100 to 200 more Pashtuns, setting up another tower of heads. From Hangu, the Timurid army marched to Tall. The soldiers set out to plunder the Bangash Pashtuns of the neighborhood. Afterwards, the Timurids marched from Bangash to Bannu on the Kurram River, where they set up their third pillar of severed heads.

Roshani movement
In the second half of the 16th century, the Bangash tribe joined the Roshani movement of Pir Roshan, who migrated with his family and few of his disciples from Waziristan to Tirah. The Roshanis rebelled against the Mughal emperor Akbar, who constantly sent punitive expeditions to crush the movement. After Pir Roshan's death, the movement was led by his youngest son Pir Jalala. In 1587, Akbar sent a strong Mughal force against him to the Bangash region. In 1599, Pir Jalala took Ghazni but it was quickly recovered by the Mughals. Pir Jalala was succeeded by his nephew Ahdad, who set up a base in Charkh, Logar, and attacked Mughal-held Kabul and Jalalabad several times between 1611 and 1615, but was unsuccessful. In 1626, Ahdad died during a Mughal attack in Tirah. In 1630, when Pir Roshan's great-grandson, Abdul Qadir, launched attacks on the Mughal army in Peshawar, thousands of Pashtuns from the Bangash, Afridi, Mohmand, Kheshgi, Yusufzai, and other tribes took part. The Roshanis failed in the attack, but continued their resistance against the Mughals throughout the 17th century.

Khwaja Muhammad Bangash, who belonged to the Bangash tribe, was a famous 17th-century Pashto Sufi poet and mystic associated with the Roshani movement.

Karrani dynasty of Bengal

The Karrani dynasty was founded in 1564 by Taj Khan Karrani, a Karlani Pashtun hailing from the Kurram valley in Bangash district. It was the last dynasty to rule the Bengal Sultanate. Taj Khan Karrani was formerly an employee of the Sur Pashtun emperor, Sher Shah Suri. His capital was at Gaur (in present-day Malda district, West Bengal, India). He was succeeded by his brother Sulaiman Khan Karrani, who shifted the capital from Gaur to Tandah (also in Malda district) in 1565. In 1568, Sulaiman Khan annexed Orissa to the Karrani sultanate. Sulaiman Khan's authority extended from Cooch Behar to Puri, and from Son River to Brahmaputra River.

On 25 September 1574, the Mughal Empire captured the Karrani capital Tandah. The Battle of Tukaroi fought on 3 March 1575 forced Daud Khan Karrani, the last Karrani ruler, to withdraw to Orissa. The battle led to the Treaty of Katak in which Daud ceded the whole of Bengal and Bihar, retaining only Orissa. Daud Khan, however, later invaded Bengal, declaring independence from Mughal emperor Akbar. The Mughal onslaught against the Karrani sultanate ended with the Battle of Rajmahal on 12 July 1576, during which Daud Khan was captured and later executed by the Mughals. However, the Pashtuns and the local landlords known as Baro Bhuyans led by Isa Khan continued to resist the Mughal invasion. Later in 1612 during the reign of Jahangir, Bengal was finally integrated as a Mughal province.

Bangash state of Farrukhabad

Muhammad Khan Bangash, who belonged to the Kaghazai line of Bangash tribe, became the first Nawab of Farrukhabad in 1713 in Uttar Pradesh, India. He named the city after then Mughal emperor Farrukhsiyar. The Bangash Nawabs encouraged merchants and bankers to come and settle in Farrukhabad for the promotion of commercial activities. Very important in this respect was the establishment of the Farrukhabad mint, which apart from being an emblem of sovereignty, stimulated bullion imports and attracted numerous bankers to work in the city. The superior quality of the Farrukhabad currency, both gold and silver, was well known in the eighteenth century as it became the most trustworthy and hardest currency of northern India.

Ahmad Shah Durrani (1747–1772), the founder of the Afghan Durrani Empire, preferred coins made at the Farrukhabad mint. The third Nawab of Farrukhabad, Ahmad Khan Bangash, took part in the Third Battle of Panipat in 1761 and supported Ahmad Shah Durrani to defeat the Marathas. Because of its reputation as a centre of commerce and finance, Farrukhabad began to attract new Pashtun immigrants from Afghanistan. However, Bangash-held Farrukhabad suffered from a steep economic and political decline under the British Company Raj, because the British colonial officers ordered to close the famed Farrukhabad mint and halt the bullion trade in 1824 as part of their policy to centralize the economy of India. The abolition of the mint dealt a heavy blow to the thriving grain trade and precipitated a monetary crisis in the urban and rural areas of the region. The Bangash Nawabs continued to rule Farrukhabad until they were defeated by the British at Kannauj on 23 October 1857 during the Indian Rebellion of 1857. Today, many Bangash are settled in Uttar Pradesh, most notably in Farrukhabad.

Bhopal State

The Orakzai tribe is historically closely related to the Bangash; their traditional homeland (Orakzai District) was part of Bangash district. In 1723, Dost Mohammad Khan, who belonged to the Orakzai tribe and was formerly a mercenary in the Mughal army, founded the Bhopal State in the present-day Madhya Pradesh state of central India. After his death in 1728, his descendants, the Nawabs of Bhopal, continued ruling the state. Between 1819 and 1926, the state was ruled by four women – the Nawab Begums – unique in the royalty of those days. The third Nawab Begum of Bhopal, Shah Jahan Begum (1868–1901), built the Taj Mahal palace at Bhopal as her residence.

Hamidullah Khan, the last sovereign Nawab of the dynasty, officially acceded the state to India in 1949.

Pashto dialect 
The Bangash speak a northern or "harder" variant of Pashto similar to that of the Afridi dialect, but slightly differing in some lexicographical and phonetic features.

Religion 
Most Bangash follow the religion of Islam, split almost evenly between Twelver Shia Muslims and Hanafi Sunni Muslims. The Bangash, along with the closely related Orakzais and Turis, are the only Pashtun tribes with large Shia populations. The Shia Bangash are more concentrated around Upper Kurram and Hangu in areas like Usterzai, while the Sunni Bangash are more concentrated around Lower Kurram and Tall.

There is a small minority of Sikhs among the Bangash in Hangu, Orakzai, and Kurram. Due to the ongoing insurgency in Khyber Pakhtunkhwa, like many other tribal Pashtuns, some Pashtun Sikhs were internally displaced from their ancestral villages to settle in cities like Peshawar and Nankana Sahib.

Demographics 
The Bangash are primarily found in Pakistan, with a sizeable population also found in Afghanistan. The Bangash Pashtuns can be found all over Pakistan but majority reside in the cities of Kohat and Hangu in Khyber Pakhtunkhwa, as well as the Kurram Valley and Peshawar. In Afghanistan, they will be found in the districts that make up the historic "Loya Paktia" region, including Paktia, Paktika, and Khost. Between both Pakistan and Afghanistan, there are around 500,000 Bangash Pashtuns, with around 450,000 in Pakistan alone.

Descendants of Bangash are found in India as well but are rather than being referred to as Pashtuns, they are known as "Pathans". Instead of speaking Pashto, the Bangash Pathans of India speak either Hindi or Urdu. They are mostly found in Uttar Pradesh and mostly in the cities of Farrukhabad, Lucknow, and Gorakhpur. The descendants of the first Nawab of Farrukhabad, Muhammad Khan Bangash, have also been found in cities as far as Allahabad and Varanasi. Other Bangash descendants in India are also present in Bihar. There are around 30,000 descendants of Bangash in India but other researchers give estimates of around 70,000. Just like in Pakistan and Afghanistan, the Bangash Pathans in India prefer to marry within their own tribe, or marry with other Pathans.

Despite the Karrani dynasty and its rule in modern-day Bangladesh, there are very little number of descendants of Bangash in the country. This is because unlike in Pakistan and Afghanistan, the descendants of Bangash have mixed with the local population. The Bangash in Bangladesh are Muhajirs that migrated from Uttar Pradesh and Bihar to East Pakistan.

Culture 
The Bangash Pashtuns in Pakistan are very active socially and politically, and hold many government positions, both locally and federally. The most recent Bangash Pashtuns to hold a high position of power in the Pakistani Government is Kamran Khan Bangash and Shahzad Khan Bangash. Even the likes of Shahid Afridi, though not Bangash himself, is very close with many Bangash Pashtuns in Kohat and with the help of the local population, the Shahid Afridi Foundation was able to open a hospital in Kohat's Tangi Banda village.
The Bangash also play a huge role in the arts, especially in music. Well known Bangash musicians include Musharaf Bangash, Zeb Bangash, and Usman Bangash.
Saifullah Bangash is a Pakistani cricketer who plays for the Sindh cricket team and Karachi Kings.

In India, Salman Khurshid is believed to be a descendant of the Bangash Nawabs of Farrukhabad from his father. Khurshid was previously the Minister of External Affairs of India.

References

Karlani Pashtun tribes
Social groups of Pakistan
Pashto-language surnames
Pakistani names